The Doomsday Manuscript is a novel by Justin Richards, featuring Bernice Summerfield, a character from the spin-off media based on the long-running British science fiction television series Doctor Who.

External links
Big Finish Productions - Bernice Summerfield: The Doomsday Manuscript

2000 British novels
Bernice Summerfield novels
British science fiction novels
Big Finish Productions